Matthew Thompson is an actor most known for his role as Lodell in the film Tru Loved directed by Stewart Wade.

Filmography
2007: Gangsta Rap: The Glockumentary as Francie
2007: The Jinn as Lucas
2008: Tru Loved as Lodell
2010: Mad World as John Bunch
2011: 3 Times a Charm (post-production)
2013: Dallas Buyers ClubOthers
2008: Passport to Explore'' (TV series) as Matt, in three episodes (Portland, Seattle, Vancouver)
2009: ERA (Equal Rights for All) as Kevin (video short)

External links

Living people
Year of birth missing (living people)
American male film actors
American male television actors
21st-century American male actors